Akalan can refer to:

 Akalan, Acıpayam
 Akalan, Eğil